The Sibbald Baronetcy, of Rankelour in the County of Fife, was a title in the Baronetage of Nova Scotia.  It was created on 24 July 1630 for James Sibbald.  The title became dormant on the death of the second Baronet in circa 1680.

The Sibbald, later Scott Baronetcy, of Dunninald in the County of Forfar, was created in the Baronetage of the United Kingdom on 13 December 1806 for James Sibbald. The title became extinct on the death of the fifth Baronet in 1945.

Sibbald baronets, of Rankelour (1630)
Sir James Sibbald, 1st Baronet (died 1650)
Sir David Sibbald, 2nd Baronet (died )

Sibbald, later Scott Baronets, of Dunninald (1806)
see Scott baronets

References

Extinct baronetcies in the Baronetage of Nova Scotia
Baronetcies created with special remainders